Cassa di Risparmio di Bra is an Italian regional bank. The bank was based in Bra, in the Province of Cuneo, Piedmont.

Due to Legge Amato, the bank was split into a società per azioni and a non-profit banking foundation on 20 December 1991 (gazetted on 18 January 1992). Cassa di Risparmio di Torino (Banca CRT) once became a minority shareholders of the bank. However its successor, UniCredit sold their possession on Bra (31.021%), Fossano (23.077%), Saluzzo (31.019%) and Savigliano (31.006%) to Banca Popolare dell'Emilia Romagna for about €149 million in 2006. (which BPER paid €32.827 million for CR Bra's shares) In February 2013, BPER acquired an additional 35.98% shares from the foundation for around €23.9 million. After the deal BPER owned 67% shares.

See also

 Cassa di Risparmio di Cuneo

References

External links
  

Banks established in 1842
1842 establishments in the Kingdom of Sardinia
Banks of Italy
Companies based in Piedmont
Province of Cuneo
BPER Banca
Italian companies established in 1842